Yetfa and Biksi (Biaksi; Inisine) are dialects of a language spoken in Jetfa District, Papua, Indonesia, and across the border in Papua New Guinea. It is a trade language spoken in West Papua up to the PNG border.

According to Hammarström (2008), it is being passed on to children and is not in immediate danger.

External relationships
Yetfa is not close to other languages. Ross (2005), following Laycock & Z’Graggen (1975), places Biksi in its own branch of the Sepik family, but there is little data to base a classification on.  The similarities noted by Laycock are sporadic and may simply be loans; Ross based his classification on pronouns, but they are dissimilar enough for the connection to be uncertain. Usher found it to be a Southern Pauwasi language. Foley (2018) classifies it as a language isolate.

Foley (2018b: 295-296) notes that first person pronoun and third-person singular masculine pronoun in Yetfa match pronouns found in Sepik languages, with some resemblances such as nim ‘louse’ with proto-Sepik *nim ‘louse’, and wal ‘ear’ with proto-Sepik *wan. However, Foley (2018b) considers the evidence linking Yetfa to the Sepik family to be insufficient, thus classifying Yetfa as a language isolate until further evidence can be found.

Pronouns
Pronouns from Ross (2005):

{| class=wikitable
|-
| I || nyo || we || nana
|-
| thou || pwo || you || so
|-
| s/he || do || they || dwa
|}

Pronouns from Kim (2005), as quoted in Foley (2018):

{| 
|+ Yetfa independent pronouns
!  !! sg !! pl
|-
! 1
| na || no
|-
! 2
| po || so-na-m
|-
! 3
| do || do-na-ma
|}

Basic vocabulary
Basic vocabulary of Yetfa from Kim (2006), quoted in Foley (2018):

{| 
|+ Yetfa basic vocabulary
! gloss !! Yetfa
|-
| ‘bird’ || dau
|-
| ‘blood’ || dueal
|-
| ‘bone’ || fan
|-
| ‘breast’ || nom
|-
| ‘ear’ || wal
|-
| ‘eat’ || ɲa
|-
| ‘egg’ || nela
|-
| ‘eye’ || i
|-
| ‘fire’ || yao
|-
| ‘give’ || ni-
|-
| ‘go’ || la-
|-
| ‘ground’ || permai
|-
| ‘hair’ || framai
|-
| ‘hear’ || wi-
|-
| ‘I’ || na(wo)
|-
| ‘leg’ || yop
|-
| ‘louse’ || nim
|-
| ‘man’ || nam
|-
| ‘moon’ || dirmanel
|-
| ‘name’ || met
|-
| ‘one’ || kəsa
|-
| ‘road, path’ || mla
|-
| ‘see’ || am-
|-
| ‘sky’ || aklai
|-
| ‘stone’ || tekop
|-
| ‘sun’ || imenel
|-
| ‘tongue’ || mor
|-
| ‘tooth’ || doa
|-
| ‘tree’ || yo
|-
| ‘two’ || daisil
|-
| ‘water’ || ket
|-
| ‘we’ || no(wo)
|-
| ‘woman’ || romo
|-
| ‘you (sg)’ || po(wo)
|-
| ‘you (pl)’ || sonam
|}

The following basic vocabulary words are from Conrad & Dye (1975) and Voorhoeve (1975), as cited in the Trans-New Guinea database:

{| class="wikitable sortable"
! gloss !! Yetfa
|-
| head || fran; ᵽr᷈an
|-
| hair || fra may; ᵽʌřamai
|-
| eye || i; ʔiʔ
|-
| nose || ndor
|-
| tooth || ɔřa; rwa
|-
| tongue || moR᷈
|-
| louse || ni:m; yim
|-
| dog || say
|-
| pig || mbaR᷈; mualə
|-
| bird || rawi
|-
| egg || řonǏa
|-
| blood || ndwal
|-
| bone || fan
|-
| skin || tol; toR᷈
|-
| tree || yau; yo; yɔ
|-
| man || nam
|-
| woman || namiyaA
|-
| sun || məlel
|-
| water || kel; kɛr᷈
|-
| fire || yaʋ; yau
|-
| stone || təkoup; tɩkɔᵽ
|-
| road, path || miaA
|-
| eat || ŋa; ntɛřᵽI
|-
| one || kəsa; kɛsa
|-
| two || ndyesel; tesyɛnsaR᷈
|}

Sentences
There is very little sentence data for Yetfa. Some of the few documented Yetfa sentences are:

The Yetfa tense suffix -(y)o is also present in Tofanma.

References

External links
Yetfa word list at TransNewGuinea.org

Languages of western New Guinea
Languages of Papua New Guinea
South Pauwasi languages